All Mixed Up is a 1985 French comedy film directed by Josiane Balasko and starring Balasko and Isabelle Huppert.

Plot
A vamp commuter takes refuge with her neighbor, half a bag lady rather ugly and suicidal. Believing murderess of her alcoholic husband policeman and she just put it out of harm's way, she embarks on his escape her neighbor and an offender on the run almost despite himself.

Cast
 Isabelle Huppert as Rose-Marie Martin
 Josiane Balasko as Anita
 Farid Chopel as Rico Da Silva
 Jean Carmet as M. Buzinski
 Coluche as Coyotte
 Dominique Lavanant as Doctor Belin's nurse
 Daniel Russo as André Martin
 Howard Vernon as Docteur Belin
 Bruno Moynot as The policeman

See also
 Isabelle Huppert on screen and stage

References

External links

1985 films
Warner Bros. films
1985 comedy films
1980s French-language films
French comedy films
Films directed by Josiane Balasko
Films with screenplays by Jacques Audiard
1980s French films